The Sampling Officials, also called Syndics of the Drapers’ Guild, is a 1662 oil painting by Rembrandt. It is currently owned by the Rijksmuseum in Amsterdam. It has been described as his "last great collective portrait".

The men (with the exception of Bel who is an attendant as indicated by his calotte) are drapers who were elected to assess the quality of cloth that weavers offered for sale to members of their guild.  Their one-year terms in office began on Good Friday and they were expected to conduct their inspections thrice weekly.  The Dutch word staal means 'sample' and refers to the samples of cloth that were assessed. The inspectors used pliers to press the seals of their city (front) and guild (reverse) into penny-sized slugs of lead that were specially affixed to record the results of the inspection.  There were four grades of quality, the highest was indicated by pressing four seals and the lowest by pressing only one.

The men, who are appraising a length of Persian-style fabric against exemplars from a swatch book, are (from left to right):
Jacob van Loon (1595–1674)
Volckert Jansz (1605 or 1610–1681)
Willem van Doeyenburg (ca. 1616–1687)
Frans Hendricksz Bel (1629–1701)
Aernout van der Mye (ca.1625–1681)
Jochem de Neve (1629–1681)

The guild commissioned this portrait and it hung in their guildhall, the Staalhof (nl), until 1771.

The painting is used on the packaging of Dutch Masters cigars. The painting is also seen on the wall in H. G. Wells' house in the opening sequence of The Time Machine. The painting has a prominent part in Jeffrey Archer's 2019 book "Nothing Ventured".

References

External links

The Sampling Officials at the Rijksmuseum Amsterdam
Jacob van Loon biography (in Dutch)
Volckert Jansz biography (in Dutch)
Willem van Doeyenburg biography (in Dutch)
Frans Hendricksz Bel biography (in Dutch)
Aernout van der Mye biography (in Dutch)
Jochem de Neve biography (in Dutch)
Wolfgang Kosack "A second Rembrandt"

Paintings in the collection of the Rijksmuseum
Portraits by Rembrandt
History of the textile industry
1662 paintings